Åse Wisløff Nilssen (born 20 July 1945 in Kongsvinger) is a Norwegian politician for the Christian Democratic Party.

She was elected to the Norwegian Parliament from Hedmark in 1997, and was re-elected on one occasion.

Wisløff Nilssen was a member of the executive committee of Kongsvinger municipality council from 1991 to 1995, and of Finnmark county council during the terms 1987–1991 and 1995–1997.

References

1945 births
Living people
Christian Democratic Party (Norway) politicians
Women members of the Storting
Members of the Storting
21st-century Norwegian politicians
21st-century Norwegian women politicians
20th-century Norwegian politicians
20th-century Norwegian women politicians
Politicians from Kongsvinger